Kleides or Klides or Klidhes or Kleidhes, meaning keys in Greek, is a group of small rocky uninhabited islands at the north of Cyprus. Some ancient writers called them the "edge of Cyprus" (ἄκρα τῆς Κύπρου).
Strabo writes that the Kleides were two isles lying off Cyprus opposite the eastern parts of the island, which are seven hundred stadia distant from the Pyramos river. Pliny the Elder, writes that they were four islands. In reality the islets are six, but the three can considered more like rocks in the sea than islets.
The islands are also mentioned by the Ptolemy in his work Geography, Herodotus in his work Histories and Hesychius of Alexandria in his lexicon.
A poem in Greek Anthology is also mentioning the islands.

Some writers, such as Agathemenos and Hesychios named Kleides also the cape itself.

Florio Bustron (1550 - 1570) wrote about them in his work Chronique de l'Île de Chypre de Florio Bustron.
Stefano Lusignan wrote about the Kleides islands in his work Description de toute l'isle de Cypre published in 1580. 
David George Hogarth also mention the islands in his work Devia Cypria which was published in 1889.
Franz Felix Adalbert Kuhn (1812 - 1881) in the Zeitschrift für vergleichende Sprachforschung auf dem Gebiete der Indogermanischen Sprachen

During the British occupation of Cyprus, a lighthouse was built on one of the islets.

References

Mediterranean islands
Islands of Cyprus